Rupert Alexander George Cambridge, Viscount Trematon (24 April 1907 – 15 April 1928) was an English-born great-grandson of Queen Victoria. Originally Prince Rupert of Teck, he and his family relinquished their German titles in 1917. As heir apparent to the Earldom of Athlone, he was known as Lord Trematon, but he died before he could inherit the title.

Family

Prince Rupert was born on 24 April 1907 at Claremont House, England. His parents were Prince Alexander of Teck and the former Princess Alice of Albany, great-grandson and granddaughter of George III and Queen Victoria respectively. Prince Rupert was a haemophiliac, a condition he shared with many descendants of Queen Victoria, including his maternal grandfather, Prince Leopold, Duke of Albany, who died because of it. Rupert attended Ludgrove School and Eton as a boy. At the time of his death, he was an undergraduate at Trinity College, Cambridge.

Viscount Trematon
During the First World War, anti-German feeling in the United Kingdom led Rupert's uncle King George V to renounce all Germanic titles for himself and his family. In response to this, Prince Alexander, Rupert's father, renounced his title of a prince of Teck in the Kingdom of Württemberg and the style His Serene Highness. Alexander, along with his brother, Prince Adolphus of Teck, adopted the name Cambridge, after their maternal grandfather, Prince Adolphus, Duke of Cambridge. A few days later, the King created his brother-in-law Earl of Athlone and Viscount Trematon. Alexander was now styled The Right Honourable The Earl of Athlone. Rupert adopted the courtesy title of Viscount Trematon. His mother retained her title of Princess of Great Britain and Ireland with the style Her Royal Highness and became known as Princess Alice, Countess of Athlone.

Death
Viscount Trematon died on 15 April 1928 from an intracerebral hemorrhage as a result of a car crash in France. On 1 April 1928, Lord Trematon was driving with two friends on the road from Paris to Lyon.  While overtaking another vehicle, Trematon's car hit a tree and overturned. One of his friends died from injuries and Trematon was taken to a nearby hospital at Belleville-sur-Saône with a slight fracture of the skull. He never recovered and died in hospital in the early hours of 15 April. His funeral took place in St George's Chapel, Windsor Castle, and was attended by King George V and Queen Mary. He was interred in the Royal Vault at St George's Chapel on 20 April before being buried in the Royal Burial Ground, Frogmore, on 23 October 1928. His death and the subsequent death of his infant brother Maurice in 1910, meant that the title of Earl of Athlone became extinct in 1957 when his father died.

References 

1907 births
1928 deaths
Alumni of Trinity College, Cambridge
Haemophilia in European royalty
People from Esher
Road incident deaths in France
Rupert
German princes
Burials at the Royal Burial Ground, Frogmore
British courtesy viscounts
Heirs apparent who never acceded
Royal reburials
People educated at Ludgrove School
People educated at Eton College